José Mendes de Carvalho (c. 1941 – April 14, 1968), known by his nom de guerre Hoji-ya-Henda, was a guerrilla fighter of the People's Armed Forces for the Liberation of Angola (FAPLA). Now remembered as a folk hero in Angola, he was killed during the Portuguese Colonial War.

Mendes died in combat, at 27 years old, during a raid on the headquarters of the Portuguese colonial army in Karipande, Moxico, Angola, on April 14, 1968.  He was buried near the river Lundoji  from the then headquarters of Karipande, from the Front East of the Third Political-Military Region. In August 1968, the People's Liberation Movement of Angola (MPLA) assigned Hoji-ya-Henda the title of "dear son of the Angolan people and heroic fighter of the MPLA".

The First Assembly of the Third Political-Military Region of the MPLA, held on March 23, 1969, determined that April 14 would be celebrated in Angola as Angolan Youth Day in his memory. The decision was later confirmed by an assembly of youth organisations, some of them affiliated to the National Youth Council (CNJ) that gathered in Cabinda for a  number of years.

References

Notes

Web references
 Peace treaties to Angola
 Angola - Datas and Factos
 Jornal de Angola
Bibliography
 Tor Sellstrom, Liberation in Southern Africa - Regional and Swedish Voices: Interviews from Angola, Mozambique, Namibia, South Africa, Zimbabwe, the Frontline and Sweden, Nordic Africa Institute, 2002, 365 pag. - (pag. 28)
 Edward George, The Cuban Intervention in Angola, 1965-1991: From Che Guevara to Cuito Cuanavale, Routledge, 2005, 354 pag. - (pag. 314)
 John A. Marcum, The Angolan Revolution: Vol. 2, Exile Politics and Guerrilla Warfare (1962–1976), Cambridge, Massachusetts, and London:: MIT Press, 1978, 473 pag.
 Roberto Correia, Angola - Datas e Factos - (5º Volume - 1961/1975), 2002, 376 pag.
 Paulo Miguel Júnior, José Mendes de Carvalho (Comandante Hoji Ya Henda) – Um testemunho à sua memória, 2001

Angolan revolutionaries
1968 in Angola